Germacranolides are a group of natural chemical compounds classified as sesquiterpene lactones.  They are found in a variety of plant sources.

References

Sesquiterpene lactones
Oxygen heterocycles